Neuville may refer to:

Communes in France
Neuville, Corrèze, in the Corrèze département
Neuville, Puy-de-Dôme, in the Puy-de-Dôme département
Neuville-au-Bois, in the Somme département
Neuville-au-Cornet, in the Pas-de-Calais département 
Neuville-au-Plain, in the Manche département
Neuville-aux-Bois, in the Loiret département 
Neuville-Bosc, in the Oise département 
Neuville-Bourjonval, in the Pas-de-Calais département 
Neuville-Coppegueule, in the Somme département
Neuville-Day, in the Ardennes département 
Neuville-de-Poitou, in the Vienne département
Neuville-en-Avesnois, in the Nord département 
Neuville-en-Beaumont, in the Manche département 
Neuville-en-Ferrain, in the Nord département 
Neuville-en-Verdunois, in the Meuse département 
Neuville-Ferrières, in the Seine-Maritime département 
Neuville-les-Dames, in the Ain département
Neuville-lès-Decize, in the Nièvre département 
Neuville-lès-Loeuilly, in the Somme département
Neuville-lès-This, in the Ardennes département 
Neuville-lès-Vaucouleurs, in the Meuse département
Neuville-lez-Beaulieu, in the Ardennes département 
Neuville-près-Sées, in the Orne département 
Neuville-Saint-Amand, in the Aisne département 
Neuville-Saint-Rémy, in the Nord département
Neuville-Saint-Vaast, in the Pas-de-Calais département 
Neuville-sous-Montreuil, in the Pas-de-Calais département
Neuville-sur-Ailette, in the Aisne département 
Neuville-sur-Ain, in the Ain département   
Neuville-sur-Authou, in the Eure département 
Neuville-sur-Brenne, in the Indre-et-Loire département 
Neuville-sur-Escaut, in the Nord département 
Neuville-sur-Margival, in the Aisne département
Neuville-sur-Oise, in the Val-d'Oise département 
Neuville-sur-Ornain, in the Meuse département
Neuville-sur-Saône, in the Rhône département 
Neuville-sur-Sarthe, in the Sarthe département
Neuville-sur-Seine, in the Aube département 
Neuville-sur-Touques, in the Orne département 
Neuville-sur-Vannes, in the Aube département 
Neuville-Vitasse, in the Pas-de-Calais département

Municipalities in Canada 
Neuville, Quebec, in Portneuf County (Quebec)

People with the surname
Alphonse-Marie-Adolphe de Neuville, French painter
Oliver Neuville, former German striker born in Switzerland
Thierry Neuville, Belgian WRC driver
Thomas M. Neuville (1950=2022), American politician and judge

Other uses
The Neuville, a historic apartment building in Chicago, Illinois, US

See also 
 La Neuville (disambiguation)
 Laneuville (disambiguation)
 Villeneuve (disambiguation)